Santa Isabel is a district of the Río Cuarto canton, in the Alajuela province of Costa Rica.

History 
Santa Isabel was created on 11 October 2018 by Acuerdo Ejecutivo N°044-2018-MGP.

Geography 
Santa Isabel has an area of  km² and an elevation of  metres.

Settlements
The eponymous Santa Isabel village is its head village, and it also encompasses the villages of Los Lagos, Merced, Pinar, San Fernando, San José, San Rafael and San Vicente.

Demographics 

For the 2011 census, Santa Isabel had not been created, its inhabitants were part of Río Cuarto canton when it was a district of Grecia canton.

Transportation

Road transportation 
The district is covered by the following road routes:
 National Route 744
 National Route 745

References 

Districts of Alajuela Province
Populated places in Alajuela Province